This is a list of Florida Union Civil War units. The list of Florida Confederate Civil War units is shown separately. Although Florida seceded there was a pro-Union and anti-Confederate minority in the state, an element that grew as the war progressed. Thus over 2,200 Floridians served in Union units.

Cavalry 
 1st Florida Cavalry Regiment (Union)
 2nd Florida Cavalry Regiment (Union)
Independent Union Rangers of Taylor County
 1st East Florida Cavalry (Union)
 Florida Rangers (were eventually consolidated into the 2nd Florida Cavalry)

Miscellaneous 
Florida Irregulars
Unassigned Florida Volunteers
Union Volunteer Corp Key West Florida

See also 
Lists of American Civil War Regiments by State
Confederate Units by State
Southern Unionists

Sources and External Links 

Florida
Civil War
Florida in the American Civil War